The name Shanshan has been used to name four tropical cyclones in the northwestern Pacific Ocean. The name was submitted by Hong Kong and it is commemorative to the first athlete, Lee Lai-shan, to win an Olympic medal representing Hong Kong. It is also a common girls' given name in Hong Kong. It is part of a series of reduplicated typhoon names from Hong Kong, like Tingting, Yanyan and Lingling.

 Typhoon Shanshan (2000) (T0018, 26W) – not a threat to land.
 Typhoon Shanshan (2006) (T0613, 14W, Luis) – impacted Japan.
 Tropical Storm Shanshan (2013) (T1302, 02W, Crising) – brought rains to the Philippines, Vietnam and Malaysia.
 Typhoon Shanshan (2018) (T1813, 17W)

References 

Pacific typhoon set index articles